Jordan Thompson was the defending champion but chose not to defend his title.

Márton Fucsovics won the title after defeating Leandro Riedi 7–5, 6–4 in the final.

Seeds

Draw

Finals

Top half

Bottom half

References

External links
Main draw
Qualifying draw

Canberra Tennis International - 1
2023 Men's singles